Gorka Izagirre Insausti (born 7 October 1987) is a Spanish professional cyclist, who rides for UCI WorldTeam . He is the brother of fellow racing cyclist Ion Izagirre.

Career

Movistar Team (2014–17) 
Izagirre won the Prueba Villafranca de Ordizia for the third time in his career in 2014. His first top 10 in a World Tour stage race came in 2015, when he placed 9th in Paris–Nice. In 2017, Izagirre finished fourth overall at Paris–Nice, and won stage 8 in the 100th edition of the Giro d'Italia.

Bahrain–Merida (2018) 
Izagirre signed with the  team for the 2018 season. He started off the season with 7th overall at Tour Down Under, and then took 3rd place overall at the Tour of Oman. He was captain of the  team together with his brother Ion Izagirre at Paris–Nice. They attacked on the downhill on the last stage and the brothers looked to finish 1st and 2nd but they both crashed in a turn on the downhill section, meaning their bikes tangled together. They lost their advantage and Gorka finished 3rd overall. In late June, Izagirre finished 2nd in the Spanish National Time Trial Championships, and days later he won the Spanish National Road Race Championships. Going into the Tour de France, Izagirre was a domestique for team captain Vincenzo Nibali, however Nibali went out of the race on stage 13, meaning Izagirre had the chance to hunt stage wins. He managed to get into the breakaway on stage 16 and finished 2nd on the stage, 15 seconds down on stage winner Julian Alaphilippe.

Astana (2019–21)
In August 2018 it was announced that the Izagirre brothers would join  in 2019. He took two individual victories with the team – the 2019 Tour de la Provence, and the 2020 Gran Trittico Lombardo.

Return to Movistar Team

Major results

Road

Source: 

2010
 1st Prueba Villafranca de Ordizia
 1st Stage 4 Tour de Luxembourg
2011
 2nd Trofeo Deia
 9th Trofeo Inca
 10th Overall Tour du Haut Var
2012
 1st Prueba Villafranca de Ordizia
2013
 7th Overall Tour Down Under
2014
 1st Prueba Villafranca de Ordizia
 1st Stage 1 (TTT) Vuelta a España
 2nd Klasika Primavera
2015
 2nd Time trial, National Road Championships
 8th Overall Tour Down Under
 9th Overall Paris–Nice
2016
 2nd Klasika Primavera
 5th Overall Dubai Tour
2017
 1st Klasika Primavera
 1st Stage 8 Giro d'Italia
 4th Overall Paris–Nice
 8th GP Miguel Induráin
2018
 National Road Championships
1st  Road race
2nd Time trial
 3rd Overall Paris–Nice
 3rd Overall Tour of Oman
 7th Overall Tour Down Under
  Combativity award Stage 13 Vuelta a España
2019
 1st  Overall Tour de la Provence
 1st Stage 1 (TTT) Vuelta a España
 3rd Time trial, National Road Championships
 4th Clásica de San Sebastián
 9th Road race, UCI Road World Championships
2020
 1st Gran Trittico Lombardo
 National Road Championships
2nd Road race
3rd Time trial
  Combativity award Stage 6 Vuelta a España
2022
 10th GP Miguel Induráin
2023
 9th Overall Tour Down Under
 10th Clásica Jaén Paraíso Interior
 10th Vuelta a Murcia

General classification results timeline

Cyclo-cross
2007–2008
 3rd National Under-23 Championships
2019–2020
 1st Abadino
 3rd National Championships
2021–2022
 1st Abadino

References

External links

1987 births
Living people
Spanish male cyclists
People from Goierri
Cyclists from the Basque Country (autonomous community)
Spanish Giro d'Italia stage winners
Sportspeople from Gipuzkoa
Olympic cyclists of Spain
Cyclists at the 2020 Summer Olympics